Vytenis Vasyliunas, FRS (born 25 September 1939) is a Lithuanian space scientist who was director of Germany's Max Planck Institute for Solar System Research from 1977 to 2007.

Life and work
Vasyliunas was born as son of the Lithuanian violinist Izidorius Vasyliūnas in 1939. He studied at Harvard College and received a degree in 1962. At the Massachusetts Institute of Technology he received his Ph.D. in 1966. In the following years he was Sloan Fellow and received the Macelwane Award in 1975.

From 1977 to 2007 he was one of the directors of Germany's Max Planck Institute for Solar System Research.

References
 

Lithuanian astronomers
Massachusetts Institute of Technology alumni
Harvard College alumni
Lithuanian organists
Living people
1939 births
Max Planck Institute directors